Rachel Kelly Crow (born January 23, 1998) is an American singer and actress. Born in Mead, Colorado, she participated in the first season of the American version of The X Factor in 2011, where she finished in fifth place. Following her elimination, she contacted Walt Disney for possible roles in future Disney productions. This resulted in her appearing in multiple television shows and films, including BrainSurge, Inside Edition, Big Time Rush, Figure It Out, The Wendy Williams Show and Fred: The Show. Crow released her first and eponymous extended play (EP) in June 2012.

Career

2011: The X Factor
Crow auditioned for the first season of the US version of The X Factor in 2011 with the song "Mercy" (2008) by Duffy. She reached the live shows and finished in fifth place in the quarter-final after competing in the sing-off with Marcus Canty and when the result went to deadlock.

2012–present: Music debut
In February 2012, it was announced that Crow signed a music deal with Columbia Records and a television deal with Nickelodeon for her own show. She was also featured on Big Time Rush's Summer Tour 2012 along with Cody Simpson, and starred on a two-part episode of Fred: The Show.

In June 2012, Crow announced via Twitter that she would be releasing a five-song EP, featuring one song co-written by Crow herself. She later announced via her website that it would be released on June 26, 2012 and would be self-titled. The lead single is "Mean Girls," which Crow co-wrote with Toby Gad. Gad also produced the song. The four other songs are "Rock With You" featuring rapper Mann, "Lemonade," "My Kind of Wonderful" and "What A Song Can Do." She has also worked with producer Jonas Jeberg, who has worked with singers such as The Wanted.

In his review of 'Mean Girls', The Re-View complimented Crow's "intelligence and aspirations" and finished his article saying of the singer: "I don't doubt that her vocal ability to out-diva some of the best singers will lead to even greater things in the future."

In September 2017, she was picked as Elvis Duran's Artist of the Month and was featured on NBC's Today show and broadcast nationally where she performed live her single "Dime".

Television and acting career
Rachel Crow appeared on a few Nickelodeon shows in the early 2010s such as Fred: The Show, and Big Time Rush and had signed a series development deal with the network, though this did not result in an aired series. Crow said that she would have wanted to duet with Eminem if she had a series.

Crow voiced Carla in the film Rio 2, which was released in 2014. Crow also provided the voice of Gratuity "Tip" Tucci on the Netflix cartoon Home: Adventures with Tip and Oh.

In 2017, Crow starred alongside Ashleigh Murray in the Netflix original film Deidra & Laney Rob a Train, which holds a 92% "certified fresh" rating on Rotten Tomatoes.

Rachel Crow also starred in ABC's Schooled as recurring character "Felicia Somers". Crow appeared in 4 episodes of the first season.

Filmography

Film

Television

Discography

Extended plays

Singles

Other appearances

Music videos

References

External links
 Rachel Crow on X Factor
 
 Rachel Crow Discography 
 Rachel Crow Rachel Crow 

1998 births
Actresses from Colorado
American voice actresses
African-American female comedians
21st-century African-American women singers
American adoptees
21st-century American singers
21st-century American actresses
American child singers
American film actresses
American television actresses
American women comedians
Child pop musicians
Living people
Singers from Colorado
People from Weld County, Colorado
The X Factor (American TV series) contestants
African-American actresses
American child actresses
21st-century American comedians
21st-century American women singers